Erebia ajanensis  is a  butterfly found in the East  Palearctic (China, Korea, Amur, Ussuri, Magadan) that belongs to the browns family. 
E. a. ajanensis North Amur
E. a. arsenjevi    Kurentzov, 1950   Ussuri
E. a. kosterini     Gorbunov, Korshunov & Dubatolov, 1995   Magadan (Koni Peninsula)

Description from Seitz

ajanensis Men. (= eumonia Men.)  (37 g), from the Amur and Ussuri, differs but little from the nymotypical form [of ligea]. The white band on the hindwing beneath is broader and more continuous, there being some obsolescent white spots near the base, which are occasionally also found in the nymotypical

See also
List of butterflies of Russia

References

Satyrinae